The 2023 Cavalry FC season is the fifth season in the history of Cavalry FC. In addition to the Canadian Premier League, the club will compete in the Canadian Championship.

Current squad 
As of March 17, 2023

Transfers

In

Draft picks 
Cavalry FC selected the following players in the 2023 CPL–U Sports Draft. Draft picks are not automatically signed to the team roster. Only those who are signed to a contract will be listed as transfers in.

Out

References

External links 
Official Site

2023
2023 Canadian Premier League
Canadian soccer clubs 2023 season